Wishing You A Rave Christmas is the fourth EP by The Raveonettes, and was released on 25 November 2008. It is the third release in a three-part release of digital download EPs over three months. For reasons unknown, the previously released single The Christmas Song is not included in this collection.

Track listing

References

2008 EPs
2008 Christmas albums
The Raveonettes albums
Vice Records albums
Christmas albums by Danish artists